The Tennis Court Oath is an event in the French Revolution.

The Tennis Court Oath may also refer to:
The Tennis Court Oath (book), a 1962 book by John Ashbery
The Tennis Court Oath (David), an incomplete painting by Jacques-Louis David

See also
Tennis court (disambiguation)